Turbo castanea, common names chestnut turban, chestnut turban snail-brown and cat eye snail, is a species of sea snail, marine gastropod mollusk in the family Turbinidae.

Distribution
Distribution of Turbo castanea include: Aruba, Belize, Bonaire, Caribbean Sea, Cayman Islands, Colombia, Costa Rica, Cuba, Curaçao, Gulf of Mexico, Hispaniola, Jamaica, Mexico, Panama, Puerto Rico, Venezuela.; in the Atlantic Ocean from North Carolina to Brazil.

Description 
The maximum recorded shell length is 55 mm.

This is an abundant species that is variable both in color and the prominence of the sculpture. The solid, imperforate shell has an ovate-conic shape. It is orange-colored, brown or gray, sometimes banded, flammulated, or maculated with white or brown. The conic spire is acute. The suture is subcanaliculate. The 5-6 convex whorls are somewhat flattened in the middle. They are ornamented with numerous unequal spiral granose, spinose or squamose lirae, of which the subsutural and three or four submedian are more prominent. The typical form is very sharply sculptured, the principal lirae occasionally bearing vaulted scales. The white aperture is subcircular, and subangular above. There is no umbilicus. The peristome is slightly produced below. The columella has a heavy white callus.

The operculum is castaneous within, with four rapidly increasing whorls. Its nucleus is one-third the distance across the face. The outer surface is convex and nearly smooth. It is white, or stained with brown and green around the middle.

Habitat 
Minimum recorded depth is 0 m. Maximum recorded depth is 141 m.

References

 Gmelin, J. F. 1791. Systema naturae per regna tria naturae. Editio decima tertia. Systema Naturae, 13th ed., vol. 1(6): 3021–3910. Lipsiae
 Röding, P. F. 1798. Museum Boltenianum.  viii + 199 pp. Hamburg.
 Anton, H. E. 1838. Verzeichniss der Conchylien.  xvi + 110 pp
 Donovan, E. 1804. The Natural History of British Shells, including figures and descriptions of all the species hitherto discovered in Great Britain, systemically arranged in the Linnean manner, with scientific and general observations on each. Natural History of British Shells
 Lamarck, [J. B.] 1822. Histoire naturelle des animaux sans vertèbres. Histoire Naturelle des Animaux sans Vertèbres 7: [iii] + 711 pp. Author: Paris
 Philippi, R. A. 1849. Centuria altera testaceorum novorum. Zeitschrift für Malakozoologie 5: 99-112
 Pilsbry, H. A. and T. L. McGinty. 1945. Cyclostrematidae and Vitrinellidae of Florida—I. Nautilus 59: 1-13, pls. 1-2
 Usticke, G. W. Nowell. 1959. A Check List of Marine Shells of St. Croix.  vi + 90, 4 pls. Author: Christiansted, St. Croix
 Weisbord, N. E. 1962. Late Cenozoic gastropods from northern Venezuela. Bulletins of American Paleontology 42(193): 672 pp., 48 pls.
 Turgeon, D.D., et al. 1998. Common and scientific names of aquatic invertebrates of the United States and Canada. American Fisheries Society Special Publication 26 page(s): 60
 Alf A. & Kreipl K. (2003). A Conchological Iconography: The Family Turbinidae, Subfamily Turbininae, Genus Turbo. Conchbooks, Hackenheim Germany.
 Williams, S.T. (2007). Origins and diversification of Indo-West Pacific marine fauna: evolutionary history and biogeography of turban shells (Gastropoda, Turbinidae). Biological Journal of the Linnean Society, 2007, 92, 573–592. Rosenberg, G., F. Moretzsohn, and E. F. García. 2009. Gastropoda (Mollusca) of the Gulf of Mexico, Pp. 579–699 in Felder, D.L. and D.K. Camp (eds.), Gulf of Mexico–Origins, Waters, and Biota. Biodiversity. Texas A&M Press, College Station, Texas. 
 Rubio F., Fernández-Garcés R. & Rolán E. (2011) The family Tornidae (Gastropoda, Rissooidea) in the Caribbean and neighboring areas. Iberus 29(2): 1–230. [December 2011]

External links

 

castanea
Gastropods described in 1791
Taxa named by Johann Friedrich Gmelin